The Holy League was a military alliance of the chief Christian states of the Aegean Sea and the Eastern Mediterranean against the mounting threat of naval raids by the Turkish beyliks of Anatolia. The alliance was spearheaded by the main regional naval power, the Republic of Venice, and included the Knights Hospitaller, the Kingdom of Cyprus, and the Byzantine Empire, while other states also promised support. After a notable success in the Battle of Adramyttion, the Turkish naval threat receded for a while; coupled with the diverging interests of its members, the league atrophied and ended in 1336/7.

Sources
 
 

14th-century military alliances
1332 establishments in Europe
1337 disestablishments
Crusades
Foreign relations of the Byzantine Empire
Foreign relations of the Republic of Venice
Holy Leagues